Luna Live is a live album by Luna released by the Arena Rock Recording Co. It was recorded at the 9:30 Club in Washington, D.C., and at The Knitting Factory in New York.

Critical reception
Spin likened the album to "Sinatra's In the Wee Small Hours remade by the Velvets."

Track listing
All lyrics by Dean Wareham, music by Luna, except where noted.

 "Bewitched" – 4:38
 "Chinatown" – 4:53
 "Double Feature" – 4:14
 "Pup Tent" – 6:00
 "Sideshow by the Seashore" – 3:05
 "Anesthesia" – 4:43
 "Tiger Lily" – 5:03
 "4000 Days" – 4:12
 "Hello Little One" – 4:29
 "Moon Palace" – 3:38
 "Lost in Space" – 3:35
 "23 Minutes in Brussels" – 7:46
 "4th of July" (a Galaxie 500 cover) – 4:57
 "Bonnie and Clyde" (Serge Gainsbourg) – 6:04

Track 3 mislabeled "Friendly Advice" on the CD cover.

The 2 LP vinyl release included four additional tracks:

 "California" - 4:13
 "Friendly Advice" - 6:14
 "Bobby Peru" - 4:03
 "Indian Summer" (a Beat Happening cover) - 7:07

References

External links
Arena Rock Recording Co.

Luna (1990s American band) albums
2001 live albums
Arena Rock Recording Company live albums